"Pilot", also known as "Everybody Lies," is the first episode of the medical drama House. The episode premiered on the Fox network on November 16, 2004. It introduces the character of Dr. Gregory House (played by Hugh Laurie)—a maverick antisocial doctor—and his team of diagnosticians at the fictional Princeton-Plainsboro Teaching Hospital in New Jersey. The episode features House's attempts to diagnose a kindergarten teacher after she collapses in class.

House was created by David Shore, who got the idea for the misanthropic title character from a doctor's visit. Initially, producer Bryan Singer wanted an American to play House, but British actor Hugh Laurie's audition convinced him that a foreign actor could play the role. Shore wrote House as a character with parallels to Sherlock Holmes—both are drug users, blunt, and close to being friendless. The show's producers wanted House handicapped in some way and gave the character a damaged leg arising from an improper diagnosis.

The episode received generally positive reviews; the character of House was widely noted as a unique aspect of the episode and series, though some reviewers believed that such a cruel character would not be tolerated in real life. Other complaints with the episode included stereotyped supporting characters and an implausible premise. The initial broadcast of "Pilot" was watched by approximately seven million viewers, making it the 62nd-most-watched show of the week.

Plot 
Shortly after the start of class, kindergarten teacher Rebecca Adler becomes dysphasic and experiences seizures. Dr. James Wilson attempts to convince Gregory House to treat Adler, but House initially dismisses him, believing that the case would be boring. Hospital administrator Dr. Lisa Cuddy approaches House in the elevator and attempts to persuade him to fulfill his duties at the hospital's walk-in clinic. House refuses, claiming that Cuddy cannot fire him due to tenure, and hurriedly leaves. When House's team attempts to perform an MRI on Adler, they discover that House's authorization for diagnostics has been revoked; Cuddy restores his authorization in exchange for his working at the clinic.

Adler's throat closes up during the MRI due to an allergic reaction to gadolinium, prompting two members of House's team, Dr. Robert Chase (Jesse Spencer) and Dr. Allison Cameron (Jennifer Morrison), to perform a tracheotomy. In the hospital's clinic, House's first patient is a man who is orange because of an over-consumption of carrots and vitamins (niacin). House also treats a ten-year-old boy whose mother allows him to use his asthmatic inhaler only intermittently instead of daily as prescribed. House criticizes the mother for making such a drastic medical decision without first learning more about asthma. During his monologue, House stumbles on an idea and leaves quickly to treat Adler; he diagnoses her with cerebral vasculitis, despite having no proof. House treats Adler with steroids, which improves her condition greatly for a time, until she starts seizing and has heart failure.

On House's insistence, neurologist Dr. Eric Foreman and Cameron break into Adler's house to find anything that might account for Adler's symptoms. They find an opened package of ham in Adler's kitchen and House concludes that she is suffering from neurocysticercosis from eating undercooked pork at some point in her past. Adler refuses to accept more random treatments unless there is conclusive evidence that the diagnosis is correct. House is ready to dismiss the case when Chase provides an idea for noninvasive evidence of Adler's tapeworm infection; by taking an X-ray of her thigh, House proves that Adler is infested with other tapeworms and her condition is treatable. After seeing the evidence, Adler agrees to take medication to kill the tapeworms.

Production

Conception 

Series creator David Shore traced the concept for House to his background as a patient at a teaching hospital. Shore recalled that "I knew, as soon as I left the room, they would be mocking me relentlessly [for my cluelessness...] and I thought that it would be interesting to see a character who actually did that before they left the room." In 2004, Shore and executive producers Katie Jacobs and Paul Attanasio pitched House to Fox as a medical detective show—a hospital whodunit where the doctors would be the sleuths looking for the source of symptoms. The ideas behind House's character were added after Fox bought the show. Shore wrote the pilot with a vivid memory of a doctor's visit: he once had to wait two weeks to get a doctor's appointment for a sore hip, by which point his pain had disappeared. Nevertheless, Shore stated that the doctors were "incredibly polite". Shore later stated that, as he wrote the pilot, he fell in love with a doctor character who would actually say that Shore was wasting the hospital's time.

A central part of the show's premise was that the main character would be handicapped. The initial idea was for House to use a wheelchair, but Fox turned down this interpretation (for which the crew was later grateful). The wheelchair idea turned into a scar on House's face, which later turned into a bad leg necessitating use of a cane. The original script called for House to be 34 years old; however, Shore later explained that he did not want the character to be that young.

The episode was written by the series creator David Shore, and was shot in Canada; later episodes would be shot on soundstages in California. Shore said that the writings of Berton Roueché, a The New Yorker staff writer who chronicled intriguing medical cases, inspired the plots for "Pilot" and other early episodes.

Casting 

Producer Bryan Singer originally demanded that an American actor play the role of House; according to Singer, the more foreign actors he watched audition for the part, the more sure he was that an American was needed. At the time of casting, Hugh Laurie was filming the movie Flight of the Phoenix. He put together an audition tape in a Namibian hotel bathroom, the only place with enough light, and apologized for its appearance (which Singer compared to a "bin Laden video"). Laurie improvised by using an umbrella for a cane. Singer was impressed by Laurie's performance and commented on how well the "American actor" grasped the character, unaware that Laurie was British.

Laurie initially believed that House was merely the "sidekick" of Wilson, because the script referred to Wilson as a doctor with "boyish" looks. Laurie did not realize that House was the protagonist until he read the full teleplay. According to Shore, "It's easy to make an asshole character unlikable. What's tricky is to make them watchable. And Hugh came in and brought everything that was there to the part, the nastiness, the not politically correct stuff. And yet you wanted to watch him, you wanted to spend time with him."

Similarities between House and the famous fictional detective Sherlock Holmes appear in the pilot; Shore explained that he was always a fan of Holmes, and found the character's traits of indifference to his clients unique. House and Holmes have only one real friend (Wilson and Watson, respectively) who connects the cerebral hero to human concerns. This Holmes and Watson dynamic was something the producers were looking for in the characters of House and Wilson, especially in terms of chemistry.

Before being cast as Wilson, Robert Sean Leonard read the pilot scripts to Numb3rs and was planning to audition for the part, but instead auditioned for House because he enjoyed the role of being "the guy [the protagonist] counts on," as well as the similarities to Sherlock Holmes. Leonard felt he did not audition well, and thought his long friendship with Singer helped land him the role. When asked in an interview why his character would ever be friends with House, Leonard replied:

Australian actor Jesse Spencer's agent suggested that Spencer audition for the role of Chase, but he was hesitant, fearing the show might be similar to General Hospital. Once the actor saw the scripts, he changed his mind; Spencer then persuaded the producers to make his character into an Australian. Omar Epps, who plays Foreman, found inspiration from his work as a troubled intern on the TV show ER. Epps and co-star Jennifer Morrison read the scripts and believed that the show would be either a hit or miss.

Reception 
Houses premiere episode was generally well received. Critics reacted positively to the character of House; Tom Shales of The Washington Post called him "the most electrifying character to hit television in years." New York called the series "medical TV at its most satisfying and basic," and stated that the cast consisted of "[professional] actors playing doctors who come to care about their patients," while The Boston Globes Matthew Gilbert appreciated that the episode did not sugarcoat the flaws of the characters to assuage viewers' fears about "HMO factories." Alessandra Stanley of The New York Times said that though the characters might be a turn-off to some viewers, the gore and "derivative gall" of the show were positives to fans of procedural dramas; TV Guides Matt Roush stated House was an "uncommon cure for the common medical drama." Critics of The A.V. Club called House the "nastiest" black comedy from Fox since the 1996 short-lived television series Profit. Critics considered the series to be a bright spot among Fox's otherwise reality television-based broadcast schedule.

The episode's format was compared to a rival television series, Medical Investigation. USA Today favorably stated House as more character-driven than Investigations "plot-driven procedural," and the San Francisco Chronicle felt that House was the better show due to the title character. Varietys Brian Lowry, meanwhile, stated that the two shows were too similar and House was mismatched among Fox's other programs. Other complaints included perceived stereotypes of young, attractive doctors.  Sherwin Nuland of Slate gave the first episodes of the series a highly negative review, stating that "Of all the medical errata in this series (and there are some whoppers), the greatest is surely the conceit that a physician so remote, so neglectful of duty, so sadistic, so downright cruel as Gregory House would be tolerated in any hospital." Kay McFadden of The Seattle Times felt that Laurie's portrayal of House humanized the character, but also revealed the show's deepest flaw: "a reliance on shallow cuteness for comic relief." Other complaints included a lack of characterization for the supporting characters in the first few episodes.

The premiere attracted approximately seven million viewers in the United States, making it the 62nd-most-watched show for the week of November 15–21, 2004. The United Kingdom terrestrial premiere was broadcast on June 9, 2005, by Five and garnered a ten percent share (1.8 million viewers).  Christopher Hoag, who composed the music for "Pilot" and the first season of House, was nominated in the 2005 Primetime Emmy Awards for Outstanding Music Composition for the episode. Shore received a Humanitas Prize nomination for writing the episode, but lost out to John Wells, who wrote the episode of The West Wing entitled "NSF Thurmont". Fox marketing Vice President Chris Carlisle promoted the show by distributing nearly two million free DVDs of the program through Entertainment Weekly and People.

References

External links 

 "Pilot" at Fox Broadcasting Company
 

House (season 1) episodes
House
2004 American television episodes